Hawaiiloa (alt. Hawaii Loa or Ke Kowa i Hawaii) is a mythical Hawaiian fisherman and navigator who is said to have discovered the island of Hawaii.

Legend

Hawaiiloa was an expert fisherman and navigator who was famous for his lengthy fishing expeditions. While on a prolonged voyage, his principal navigator, Makalii, asked Hawaiiloa to steer eastward towards Aldebaran (Hokuula, meaning "red star") and the Pleiades (near the Cluster of Makalii). After sailing in this direction, he and his crew stumbled upon the island of Hawaii, which was named in Hawaiiloa's honor. Hawaiiloa returned to his homeland, Ka āina kai melemele a Kāne ("the land of the yellow sea of Kāne"), to bring his family back with him to Hawaii. He then organized a colonizing expedition with his family and eight other skilled navigators. They settled on what is now the Island of Hawaii, named in his honor.

The legend contains reference to his children: Māui (his eldest son), Kauai (son), and Oahu (daughter) who settled on the islands that bear their names.

Historical accuracy
The Hawaiiloa legend is popular amongst Hawaiians as a realistic Hawaiian origin story that is consistent with modern anthropological and historical beliefs.

However, there is currently little evidence to support its historical accuracy. The story is attested only by 19th-century sources such as Abraham Fornander and Thomas George Thrum, neither of whom provided their sources.

Hawaiiloa is also unmentioned by earlier Hawaiian historians such as David Malo. Malo chronicaled many Hawaiian origin stories, migration tales, and legends of indigenous origin. Samuel Kamakau tells of an alternate legend that the first man (Kumu-Honua) and woman (Lalo-Honua) were created on Oahu.

Canoe
 

Hawaiiloa is also the name of a voyaging canoe, built between 1991 and 1994. Named after the legendary navigator, the canoe was built for ocean navigation and has sailed internationally. The canoe Hawaiiloa is now docked at Honolulu Harbor. It is often sailed on long voyages throughout the Pacific Ocean, studying voyaging techniques used in Ancient Hawaii.

Building
To make the canoe, two Sitka spruce logs were brought to Hawaii from Southeast Alaska, donated by the SeAlaska Corporation (owned by the Tlingit, Haida, and Tshimshian tribes). These came from 400-year-old, 200 feet high trees, a size which could not be found in modern Hawaii. The hulls of the canoe were designed by Rudy and Barry Choy and Dick Rhodes, and also used numerous woods from more local sources. The canoe was made without metal parts, and used three miles of lashing.

She was initially launched in July 1993, and subsequently modified in dry dock before being re-launched a year later.

Voyages in 1995
In 1995, Hawaiiloa sailed her maiden voyage to Tahiti, Raiatea and Nuku Hiva in the Marquesas Islands in company with Hōkūlea and a third canoe from Hawaii called Makalii together with two canoes from Rarotonga: Te Au Tonga and Takitumu, and the canoe Te Aurere, from New Zealand. Subsequently that year, Hawaiiloa was shipped to Seattle and then sailed north to Alaska, visiting twenty native villages on the coastal journey between Vancouver and Juneau.

See also
 Hawaiki
 Hawaiian religion
 Hōkūlea
 Polynesian navigation
 Polynesian Voyaging Society

References

Ancient Hawaiian royalty
Hawaii culture
Hōkūleʻa
Individual sailing vessels
Legendary Hawaiian people
Legendary progenitors
Polynesian navigation
Symbols of Hawaii
Training ships
Voyaging canoes